This article provides details of unofficial international football games played by the Abkhazia national football team from 2007 to 2017.

Results

2007

2008

2017

Record by opponent

See also
 Abkhazia national football team results (2012–2019)
 Abkhazia national football team results (2020–present)

References

Football in Abkhazia
Lists of national association football team unofficial results